Larinsky is a rural locality (a khutor) and the administrative center of Larinskoye Rural Settlement, Alexeyevsky District, Volgograd Oblast, Russia. The population was 647 as of 2010.

Geography 
Larinsky is located 9 km southeast of Alexeyevskaya (the district's administrative centre) by road. Checherovsky is the nearest rural locality.

References 

Rural localities in Alexeyevsky District, Volgograd Oblast